Ross School can refer to:
The Stephen M. Ross School of Business at the University of Michigan
Ross School (East Hampton, New York), a private K-12 school in East Hampton, New York
Ross Global Academy, a former charter school in New York City